Euromasters is a gabber act from the Netherlands. Different producers have contributed to this project, although the performances were always done by Rob Christensen (Masters of Ceremony) and Fabian Kruizinga.

Members

Releases

Appearances

Mixes in which tracks are used on

References

External links
 Euromasterslive

Hardcore techno music groups
Dutch electronic music groups